Clube Desportivo Santo António Nordestinho (known as CD Santo António Nordestinho or St. Ant. Nordestinho), is a Portuguese football club based in Santo António de Nordestinho on the island of São Miguel in the Azores.

Background
CD Santo António Nordestinho is currently inactive but in 1998–99 competed in the Terceira Divisão,  which is the fourth tier of Portuguese football. The club was founded in 1973 and they play their home matches at the Campo de Jogos de Sto António in Santo António de Nordestinho.

The club is affiliated to Associação de Futebol de Ponta Delgada and has competed in the AF Ponta Delgada Taça. The club has also entered the national cup competition known as Taça de Portugal on one occasion, losing 1-0 at home to Clube União Micaelense on 2 September 2001.

Season to season

Footnotes

External links 
Clube Desportivo Santo António Nordestinho - ZeroZero

Football clubs in Portugal
Football clubs in the Azores
Association football clubs established in 1973
1973 establishments in Portugal
Football clubs in São Miguel Island